Saint Adam may refer to:
Adam, the first man according to the Bible, venerated as a saint by some Christians denominations. on December 24.
Adamo Abate, a medieval Italian abbot, venerated in Guglionesi, Italy on June 6.